Harper Peak is a peak,  high, standing east of Fortuna Peak and Fortuna Bay on the north coast of South Georgia. The name appears to be first used on a 1931 British Admiralty chart.

References

Mountains and hills of South Georgia